Uglegorsky District is an administrative district (raion) of Sakhalin Oblast, Russia; one of the seventeen in the oblast. Municipally, it is incorporated as Uglegorsky Municipal District. It is located in the western central part of the Island of Sakhalin. Its administrative center is the town of Uglegorsk. Population:

References

Notes

Sources

Districts of Sakhalin Oblast